Jørgen Hansen is a Norwegian Nordic skier who shared the Holmenkollen medal in 1918 with Hans Horn.

References
Holmenkollen medalists - click Holmenkollmedaljen for downloadable pdf file 

Holmenkollen medalists
Year of birth missing
Year of death missing
Norwegian male Nordic combined skiers
Norwegian male skiers
20th-century Norwegian people